Pitlochry railway station is a railway station serving the town of Pitlochry in Perth and Kinross, Scotland.

History
The station is situated on the former Inverness and Perth Junction Railway (I&PJR) and was opened along with the line in 1863. In 1865, The I&PJR amalgamated with other railways to create the Highland Railway.

Facilities 
There are waiting rooms on both platforms, benches and help points on both platforms, with a small car park, ticket office and toilets available on platform 1. Access to both platforms is step-free (from the car park for platform 1 and a drop-off point for platform 2), but the only way of crossing over is via the footbridge. As there are no facilities to purchase tickets, passengers must buy one in advance, or from the guard on the train.

Platform layout 

Platform 1 on the southbound line could accommodate trains having eight coaches, whereas platform 2 on the northbound line could hold eleven. Both platforms were extended in March 2019 as part of a £57 million upgrade programme by Network Rail, which also saw the station re-signalled.

Passenger volume 

The statistics cover twelve month periods that start in April.

Services
In 2022, all Highland main line services between Perth and Inverness call here. From Monday to Saturday, there are five trains each weekday to Edinburgh Waverley (including the Highland Chieftain to ) and seven to  southbound, plus the overnight sleeper to London Euston (the latter does not run southbound on Saturday nights or northbound on Sundays). Northbound there are eleven departures to Inverness.

On Sundays there are five trains to Edinburgh (including the King's Cross service) and two to Glasgow (plus the Caledonian Sleeper), along with seven to Inverness, two of which extend to Elgin.

Future proposals 
In the future, this station will be one of those to benefit from a package of timetable enhancements introduced by Transport Scotland and Scotrail. The current Perth to Inverness timetable will increase to hourly each way, with trains south of there running on alternate hours to Edinburgh and Glasgow. Journey times will be reduced by 10 minutes to both cities. As of May 2022, this has still not taken place.

References

External links 

 Video footage of the station on YouTube

Railway stations in Perth and Kinross
Former Highland Railway stations
Railway stations in Great Britain opened in 1863
Railway stations served by ScotRail
Railway stations served by Caledonian Sleeper
Railway stations served by London North Eastern Railway
Category A listed buildings in Perth and Kinross
Buildings and structures in Pitlochry